The LVII Edition of the Viña del Mar International Song Festival, also known as Viña 2016, took place from February 22 to 27, 2016 at Quinta Vergara Amphitheater, in the Chilean city of Viña del Mar.

Development

Day 1 - Monday 22

Day 2 - Tuesday 23

Day 3 - Wednesday 24

Day 4 - Thursday 25

Day 5 - Friday 26

Day 6 - Saturday 27

Jury
  | Luis Jara
  /  | Ricardo Montaner (Foreman)
  | Javiera Mena
  | Ana Torroja
  | Rick Astley
  | Humberto Sichel
  /  | Ismael Cala
  | Renata Ruiz
  | Julio César Rodríguez
  | Sandra Ossandón (Jury of the people)

Competition

International Competition

Folk Competition

Queen of the Festival

Candidates for Queen of the Festival

References

Viña del Mar International Song Festival by year
Vina Del Mar International Song Festival, 2016
2016 in music
2016 festivals in Chile
2016 music festivals
February 2016 events in South America